Yannick Andréi (18 February 1927 – 28 December 1987) was the alias of French film director and screenwriter Jean Antione Andréi. Andréi was born in Bordeaux, France and died in Neuilly-sur-Seine, France.

Career
Andréi began to work in film in 1953 as an assistant director for Jean-Pierre Melville's film Quand tu liras cette lettre. In 1959 he began to work as a screenwriter on Bonjour la chance the French adaptation of Edgar Neville's La ironía del dinero. Andréi's first film as director and screenwriter was Samedi soir in 1961. During his career he worked most often as a television director. Toward the end of his career he held an acting role in Paris-minuit, a film directed by his son Frédéric Andréi.

Family
Yannick Andréi is the father of actor and director Frédéric Andréi.

Filmography

Film
1953: Quand tu liras cette lettre, assistant director
1953: Maternité clandestine, assistant director
1953: Mon frangin du Sénégal, assistant director
1954: Sur le banc, assistant director
1956: Ces sacrées vacances, assistant director
1958: Premier mai, assistant director
1959: Deux hommes dans Manhattan, assistant director
1959: Bonjour la chance (La ironía del dinero), adaptation
1961: Samedi soir, (director and screenwriter
1975: , director and screenwriter
1985: Paris-minuit, actor

Television
1962-1963: L'inspecteur Leclerc enquête (6 episodes)
1964: L'Abonné de la ligne U
1965: Le Théâtre de la jeunesse (1 episode)
1966: Le train bleu s'arrête 13 fois (1 episode)
1967: Malican père et fils
1967: Le Chevalier Tempête
1970: Le Service des affaires classées (9 episodes)
1971: La Dame de Monsoreau
1971: Donogoo
1973: Les Aventures du capitaine Lückner
1973: L'Hiver du gentilhomme
1974: La Juive du Château-Trompette
1977: Allez la rafale!
1977: D'Artagnan amoureux
1979: La Lumière des justes
1981 Blanc, bleu, rouge
1981: La Double Vie de Théophraste Longuet
1982: Une voix la nuit
1983: La Chambre des dames
1984: Emmenez-moi au théâtre: Croque Monsieur
1985: L'Affaire Caillaux
1987: Tailleur pour dames
1988: Les Clients, TV Movie

French film directors
1987 deaths
1927 births